Topics involving the concept of anti-European sentiment:

 Anti-Europeanism
 Euroscepticism
 Anti-Western sentiment
 Euroscepticism in the United Kingdom
 American exceptionalism
 Anti-Dutch sentiment
 Anti-Estonian sentiment
 Anti-French sentiment
 Anti-German sentiment
 Anti-Hungarian sentiment
 Anti-Irish sentiment
 Anti-Italian sentiment
 Anti-Portuguese sentiment
 Anti-Romanian sentiment
 Anti-British sentiment
 Anti-Slavic sentiment
 Anti-Croatian sentiment
 Anti-Polish sentiment
 Anti-Serbian sentiment
 Anti-Ukrainian sentiment
 Anti-Russian sentiment
 Anti-Spanish sentiment

See also
 

Europe-related lists
Broad-concept articles